Damburneya leucocome is a species of plant in the family Lauraceae. It is endemic to Chiapas state in southwestern Mexico.

References

leucocome
Endemic flora of Mexico
Flora of Chiapas
Endangered biota of Mexico
Endangered flora of North America
Taxonomy articles created by Polbot